Mai Trung Thứ (An Dương, 1906-Clichy-la-Garenne, 10 October 1980), or Mai Thứ, was a Vietnamese-French painter. He was one of the graduates of the 1st (1925–1930) entering class of the École des Beaux-Arts de l'Indochine in Hanoi. He lived and worked mostly in France. His main subjects were women, children and daily life, incorporating some traditional Vietnamese conceptions about fine arts and folk arts. All his work, apart from a few oil paintings, is silk painting with gouache, by rubbing and colours applied as solids.

Biography
Mai Trung Thu (Mai Thu) was born in 1906 in Ro Nha, Kien An, Haiphong city (today: xã Tân Tiến, huyện An Dương, Hải Phòng). He was a member of the first class of the École des Beaux-Arts de l'Indochine in Hanoi along with Le Pho. During his education he developed a painting style in which he painted on silk, organizing patches of bold colors into defined areas of highlight and shadow. Mai Trung Thu's early art celebrated folk themes and the innocence of rural Vietnam, and also suggested a nostalgia for the past.

In 1937 Mai Trung Thu visited France to take part in an exhibition. He settled there for most of the rest of his life and gained a reputation as a painter of doleful, lovely women. From 1938, Mai Thu regularly participated in Fine Arts Exhibitions in Paris. He participated with the painter Le Pho in the Grand Exhibition in Algiers in 1941. He was known as an expert player of the đàn bầu, a one stringed instrument, and also as a film-maker: He was also known as a film-maker who recorded Ho Chi Minh's visit to Paris in 1946.

Works
Mai Thu has works in the Fine Arts Museum of Vietnam, and private collections, mainly in foreign countries. He held individual exhibitions with the topics: "Children of Mai Thu" (1964), "Women in Mai Thu’s Eyes" (1967) and "Mai Thu’s Poetic World" (1980) in Paris.

a mise en valeur des tableaux par le cadre 

Mai-Thu was constantly looking for ways to improve his environment. This perfectionism led him to use a long time for making the frame of his paintings.

External links

 Official Site in French
 Painter Mai Trung Thu biography
 Biography of Artist Mai Trung Thu
 Sothebys Modern & Contemporary Southeast Paintings Sale Announced

People from Haiphong
1906 births
1980 deaths
Vietnamese expatriates in France
Artists of Vietnamese descent
French people of Vietnamese descent
20th-century Vietnamese painters